De Bruyn is a Dutch and Afrikaans surname. "Bruyn" or "bruijn" is an archaic spelling of "bruin", meaning "brown". People with the name include:

Aad de Bruyn (1910–1991), Dutch 35-fold national champion in discus, shot put and hammer throw
Abraham de Bruyn (c.1539–1587), Flemish engraver
Anna Maria de Bruyn (1708–1744), Dutch stage actress and ballet dancer
Brian de Bruyn (b. 1954), Canadian-born Dutch ice hockey player
Erik de Bruyn (b. 1962), Dutch film director and actor
Ettiene de Bruyn (b. 1977), South African cricketer
Frans De Bruyn (b. 1924), Flemish writer
Günter de Bruyn (1926–2020), German author
Joe de Bruyn (b. 1949), Australian trade union official
John de Bruyn (b. 1956), Dutch-Canadian ice hockey goaltender
 (1838–1908), Belgian politician
Michelle De Bruyn (b. 1965), New Zealand professional football player
Nicolaes de Bruyn (1571–1656), Flemish engraver
Paul de Bruyn (1907–1997), German-American marathon runner
Pierre de Bruyn (b. 1977), South African cricketer
Piet De Bruyn (b. 1968), Belgian politician
Robert de Bruyn (b. 1991), South African rugby player
Sophia De Bruyn (b. 1938), South African anti-apartheid activist and provincial legislator
Theunis de Bruyn (b. 1992), South African cricketer
Tewis de Bruyn (b. 1982), South African rugby player
 (1649–1719), Flemish architect
Zander de Bruyn (b. 1975), South African cricketer
Ray de Bruyn (b. 1963), cousin of above South African cricketer

Compound surnames
Cornelis Adriaan Lobry van Troostenburg de Bruyn (1857–1904), Dutch chemist
Gerrit Willem van Oosten de Bruyn (1727–1797), Dutch lawyer
Jacob Leonard de Bruyn Kops (1822–1887), Dutch economist and politician

See also
273230 de Bruyn, an asteroid
De Bruijn
De Bruin
De Bruyne

Dutch-language surnames
Afrikaans-language surnames
Surnames of Dutch origin